In investing, upside beta is the element of traditional beta that investors do not typically associate with the true meaning of risk. It is defined to be the scaled amount by which an asset tends to move compared to a benchmark, calculated only on days when the benchmark’s return is positive.

Formula
Upside beta measures this upside risk.

with downside beta  defined with the inequality directions reversed. Therefore,  and  can be estimated with a regression of excess return of security  on excess return of the market, conditional on excess market return being below the mean (downside beta) and above the mean (upside beta)." Upside beta is calculated using asset returns only on those days when the benchmark returns are positive. Upside beta and downside beta are also differentiated in the dual-beta model.

See also
Cost of capital
Downside risk
Macro risk

References

External links
A Study of Sharpe's asymmetric beta model
Rethinking Valuation and Pricing Models, 1st Edition

Financial risk modeling